Ali Haydar Kaytan (Born 26 March 1952, Nazımiye, Tunceli, Turkey) also known as Fuad is a co-founder of the Kurdistan Workers' Party (PKK) and a member of the executive council of the Kurdistan Communities Union.

Biography
Kaytan was born in 1952 into a Kurdish family whose members were resettled in the aftermath of the Dersim rebellion. He was among the early members of a group along with Abdullah Öcalan, Haki Karer, Mazlum Doğan and Cemîl Bayik which held regular ideological meetings from 1973 onwards and which would later become known as the "Kurdistan Revolutionaries". He was among the co-founders of the Kurdistan Workers' Party which was established in November 1978. At the second party congress, which took place in Lebanon, the PKK sent him to Europe in order to raise support. On 22 July 1984, he took part in a decisive meeting in a PKK camp in the Lolan valley in Iraq where the decision was to begin with the insurgency. Cemil Bayik and Duran Kalkan also took part in the meeting. He returned to Germany, where he was arrested in 1988 and during the Kurdish Trial in Düsseldorf, he was accused of being a member of a so-called revolutionary court in Barelias, Lebanon, which sentenced two people to death. While he was in prison he entered into a hunger strike several times in protest of the pre-trial detention conditions. He was sentenced to seven years imprisonment on 7 March 1994 for being a member of a terrorist organisation, but the murders were not taken into account. The judges ruled that the murders fell under a Lebanese amnesty which covered crimes which occurred during the Lebanese civil war. He was released immediately due to his years in pre-trial detention together with Duran Kalkan, who was also charged with being a member of a terrorist organization. He then returned to Kurdistan and became a member of the co-presidency council of the Kurdistan Communities Union (KCK).

Views
He was close to Abdullah Öcalan, Kaytan is reported to have called Öcalan "the crowned personality of the Eastern thought" and presented him like a natural leader for the Kurds, while Öcalan stated that Haydar Kaytan had a "strong ideological side and interpretation capability" during the interrogation following his arrest in February 1999.

References

1952 births
2021 deaths
Hunger strikers
Kurdish rebels
Members of the Kurdistan Workers' Party
Turkish Kurdish politicians
Prisoners and detainees of Germany